Public Service Union is the name of:

 Dominica Public Service Union
 Public Service Union of Belize
 Public Service Union of Namibia
 Queensland Public Sector Union in Australia
 St. Vincent and the Grenadines Public Service Union